Diyanet Center of America (DCA) is a non-profit organization funded by the Turkish government that is based in Lanham, Maryland, serving the needs of the Muslim community in the Washington metropolitan area. The center holds regular Friday congregational prayers, Ramadan dinners, religious holiday celebrations – including Mawlid – and various other social, cultural, and religious activities.

The center benefits from its proximity to the nation's capital, various federal and state institutions, and schools.

The complex consists of five main buildings, an underground parking garage, and a geothermal well field on a 15-acre site. The five buildings are a mosque constructed using 16th century classical Ottoman architecture, a cultural center building, a guest house, a fellowship hall with a restaurant and shops, and a recreational building housing a Turkish bath, an indoor pool, and a sports center.

History
The organization was established as the Turkish American Islamic Foundation in 1993, and as the scope of services expanded it was renamed to the Turkish American Community Center (TACC) in 2003. After the completion of a comprehensive construction project, the center was renamed to its assumed business name of Diyanet Center of America, which receives major support from Directorate of Religious Affairs (Diyanet), an institution of the Government of Turkey. The result of the construction project is a small village that will be an important cultural hub for all visitors and residents of Washington D.C. area.

Affiliated mosques

Murat Mosque, Upper Pittsgrove, NJ
Turkish Islamic Cultural Center of Queens, Sunnyside, NY
Ulu Mosque of Paterson, Paterson, NJ
Springfield Imam Buhari Mosque, Indian Orchard, MA
Eyüp Sultan Mosque, Brooklyn, NY
Delaware Diyanet Camii, New Castle, DE
Ahıska Turks Community Center of Kentucky, Louisville, KY
NJ Burlington County Muslim Association, Burlington, NJ
Bergen Diyanet Mosque and Cultural Center, Cliffside Park, NJ
Turkish Society of Rochester Mosque, Rochester, NY
Long Island Mevlana Mosque, Port Jefferson Station, NY
Paterson Mevlana Mosque, Paterson, NJ
Hamidiye Mosque,  Willingboro, NJ

See also
 List of mosques in the United States
 List of mosques in the Americas
 List of mosques
Assembly of Turkish American Associations

References

External links 
 

Community centers in Maryland
Mosques in Maryland
Religious buildings and structures in Prince George's County, Maryland
Lanham, Maryland
Islamic organizations based in the United States
Turkish organizations and associations in the United States
Civic and political organizations of the United States
Foundations based in the United States
Non-profit organizations based in Maryland
1993 establishments in Maryland
European American culture in Maryland
Islam in Maryland
Middle Eastern-American culture in Maryland
Turkish diaspora in North America
Seljuk architecture 
Ottoman architecture
Islamic organizations established in the 1990s